Jacob Abel may refer to:

Jake Abel (born 1987), Australian actor
Jacob Friedrich von Abel
Jacob Abel (racing driver) (born 2001), American racing driver

See also
Jacob Abels
John Jacob Abel